The Church of Jesus Christ of Latter-day Saints in Montana refers to the Church of Jesus Christ of Latter-day Saints (LDS Church) and its members in Montana. The church's first congregation in Montana was organized in 1895. It has since grown to 51,289 members in 127 congregations.

Official church membership as a percentage of general population was 4.78% in 2014. According to the 2014 Pew Forum on Religion & Public Life survey, 4% of Montanans self-identify themselves most closely with the LDS Church. The LDS Church is the 2nd largest denomination in Montana behind the Roman Catholic Church.

Stakes are located in Billings (3), Bozeman, Butte, Frenchtown, Glendive, Great Falls (2), Helena, Kalispell, Missoula, and Stevensville.

History

Mormonism in Montana predates the formal arrival of the LDS Church. Members of the Reorganized Church of Jesus Christ of Latter Day Saints, who dissented from the LDS Church's doctrine regarding polygamy, first arrived in the Montana in 1868. The practice of polygamy was outlawed in the Montana territory, as it was in much of the western United States. It was not until 1896 that the LDS Church, having renounced the former practice of polygamy, arrived in the Montana Territory with the organization of the Montana Mission.

Plans to build an LDS Church temple in Montana were announced in August 1996. About 4,800 people gathered during a spring snowstorm to witness the groundbreaking on March 28, 1998.

In 2017, a new meetinghouse was constructed on the Billings West End, adding to the other six buildings in Billings and six others in surrounding area.

County Statistics
List of LDS Church adherents in each county as of 2010 according to the Association of Religion Data Archives: Note: Each county adherent count reflects meetinghouse location of congregation and not by location of residence. Census count reflects location of residence which may skew percent of population where adherents reside in a different county as their congregational meetinghouse.

Stakes
As of February 2023, the following stakes had congregations in Montana:

 *Stakes named outside of Montana with congregations meeting in Montana

Missions
The West Central States Mission was created on November 11, 1950 as a division of the North Central States, North Western States, and Western States missions. It was renamed Montana–Wyoming Mission in June 1970. The mission name was changed to the Montana Billings Mission four years later.

Temples

The Billings Montana Temple was dedicated on November 20, 1999 by church president Gordon B. Hinckley.

The Helena Montana Temple was announced on April 4, 2021 by church president Russell M. Nelson.

The Missoula Montana Temple was announced on April 3, 2022 by church president Russell M. Nelson.

See also

The Church of Jesus Christ of Latter-day Saints membership statistics (United States)
Religion in Montana

References

External links
 Newsroom (Montana)
 ComeUntoChrist.org Latter-day Saints Visitor site
 The Church of Jesus Christ of Latter-day Saints Official site

 
Christianity in Montana
Montana